Jaroslav Brož can refer to:

 Jaroslav Brož (long jumper) (1950–1975), Czech Olympic athlete
 Jaroslav Brož (cyclist) (born 1906), Czech Olympic cyclist